Martin Mansell (born 13 December 1960) is a former Paralympic athlete from Great Britain competing mainly in swimming.

Mansell represented Great Britain at the 1984 and 1988 Summer Paralympics in athletics and swimming. In swimming Mansell won two gold medals in the backstroke.

In 1990, Mansell was appointed as one of the first Professional Sports Development Officers for People with Disabilities within a Local Education Authority in England as a result of the sports ministers' report.

References

Paralympic athletes of Great Britain
Athletes (track and field) at the 1984 Summer Paralympics
Swimmers at the 1984 Summer Paralympics
Swimmers at the 1988 Summer Paralympics
Paralympic gold medalists for Great Britain
Paralympic silver medalists for Great Britain
Paralympic bronze medalists for Great Britain
Living people
1960 births
Medalists at the 1984 Summer Paralympics
Medalists at the 1988 Summer Paralympics
Paralympic medalists in swimming
British male freestyle swimmers
British male backstroke swimmers